The Arkansas–Fort Smith Lions (also UAFS Lions and UA Fort Smith Lions) are the athletic teams that represent the University of Arkansas–Fort Smith, located in Fort Smith, Arkansas, in NCAA Division II intercollegiate sports. The Lions compete as members of the Lone Star Conference for all 10 varsity sports.

History
In the fall of 2009, UAFS formally entered provisional NCAA Division II status. The “provisional” status was scheduled to be removed in 2010. However, on July 9, 2010, the university's membership application was rejected by the NCAA Division II Membership Committee, which led to the university filing an appeal. On July 8, 2011, the university was granted full NCAA Division II membership. Previously, the university competed in the National Junior College Athletic Association (NJCAA), specifically at the Bi-State Conference of Region II.

Varsity teams

List of teams

Men's sports
 Baseball
 Basketball
 Cross Country
 Golf
 Tennis

Women's sports
 Basketball
 Cross Country
 Golf
 Tennis
 Volleyball

Individual sports

Men's basketball
 National Champions: 1981, 2006
 Region II Champions: 2001, 2002, 2006
 Bi-State Conference Champions: 2001, 2002, 2003, 2004, 2005, 2006

Women's basketball
 National Champions: 1995
 Region II Champions: 2004, 2005, 2006
 Bi-State Conference Champions: 2003

Women's volleyball
 Region II Champions: 2002, 2003, 2005, 2006
 Bi-State Conference Champions: 2002, 2003, 2004, 2005, 2006

The volleyball program also holds the distinction of being named an NJCAA Academic All-American Team seven years in a row (1999–2005).

References

External links